Stanley Onjezani Kenani (born in 1976) is a Malawian writer of poetry and short stories. He has performed at the Arts Alive Festival in Johannesburg, South Africa, Poetry Africa in Durban, South Africa, Harare International Festival of the Arts (HIFA) in Harare, Zimbabwe, and at the Struga Poetry Evenings in North Macedonia. He has read with several famous African and world poets, including Mahmoud Darwish of Palestine, Natalie Handal of Palestine/USA, Carolyn Forche of USA, Dennis Brutus of South Africa, Keorapetse Kgositsile of South Africa, Shimmer Chinodya of Zimbabwe, Chirikure Chirikure of Zimbabwe, Benedicto Wokomaatani Malunga of Malawi and Alfred Msadala of Malawi among others.

From 2004 to 2007, Kenani served as president of the Malawi Writers Union, an organization that as of 2014 had 800 members. An accountant who is also a member of the Association of Chartered Certified Accountants (ACCA), a Certified Internal Auditor (CIA) and a Certified Public Accountant in Malawi (CPA-M), he also serves as acting treasurer for the Pan African Writers' Association (PAWA), a continental body of writers with headquarters in Accra, Ghana.

Kenani's collection of poems Slaughterhouse of Sanity is yet to be published, but several poems in it have been published in A Hudson View and other journals and magazines. His short story collection, For Honor and Other Stories, was published by eKhaya in 2011.

Awards and recognition
Kenani has won numerous awards for short story writing. In 2007, his short story "For Honour" won third prize in an HSBC/SA PEN Competition in which participants were drawn from 12 countries of Southern Africa, with the winners selected by Nobel Laureate J. M. Coetzee. The same short story was shortlisted in 2008 for the Caine Prize (the highest literary award for African writing, sometimes referred to as "The African Booker"). The story is published in the anthology African Pens: New Writing From Southern Africa 2007. In 2012, Kenani was shortlisted a second time for the Caine Prize for his story "Love on Trial".

In April 2014 he was named in the Hay Festival's Africa39 project as one of the 39 Sub-Saharan African writers aged under 40 with the potential and talent to define trends in African literature.

References

Malawian poets
Living people
1976 births
Malawian short story writers